James Converse (November 16, 1645 – July 8, 1706) was a farmer, soldier and office holder in Massachusetts, distinguishing himself as a military leader during the French and Indian Wars. Prominent in public affairs, he also served as a speaker of the Massachusetts House of Representatives.

Military service
Not much is known of Converse's early military service. In 1690, however, he was a captain on the Maine frontier commanding one of the provincial companies raised by drafts from the several militia regiments. The next year he had to bury the victims of fight at Wheelwright Pond, and later the same year he was second in command of Benjamin Church's second expedition to Maine. In 1691 Converse participated in the defense of Wells, Maine against hostile Indians, and the next year he led the defense of Wells against a larger enemy force. In 1693 Converse led provincial forces in a search and destroy operation against hostile Indians in Maine. At the outbreak of the new war in 1702, the governor made him commander of all Massachusetts provincial forces in the field.

Public offices
Although Converse is mostly known for his military activities, he was also prominent in public affairs; he served as selectman in his town, 1680-1688, 1691, 1694, 1698, 1699, 1705-1706, as well as town clerk 1689, 1691, 1693-1700. He represented Woburn in the House of Representatives 1680, 1683-1685, 1689, 1691-1692, 1695-1699, 1701-1706; serving as speaker of the House 1699 and 1702-1704.

References

Citations

Cited literature
 Eames, Steven C. (2011). Rustic Warriors. New York University Press.
 Gallay, Alan (1996). Colonial Wars of North America, 1512-1763. New York: Garland Publishing, Inc.
 Niles, Samuel (1861). "A summary narrative of the wars in New England." Collections of the Massachusetts Historical Society, V: 309-590. 
 Torrey, Clarence A. (2004). New England Marriages Prior to 1700. Boston: New England Genealogic Historical Society.
 Schutz, John. A. (1997). Legislators of the Massachusetts General Court, 1691-1780. Boston: Northeastern University Press.

1645 births
1706 deaths
People from Woburn, Massachusetts
People of colonial Massachusetts
Members of the Massachusetts General Court
Speakers of the Massachusetts House of Representatives
Military personnel from colonial Massachusetts
Military history of New England
King William's War
Queen Anne's War